It's a Fact is the first solo album by jazz musician Jeff Lorber.

Track listing

Personnel 
 Jeff Lorber – keyboards, Steinway grand piano, Fender Rhodes, Rhodes EK-10, clavinet, Oberheim OB-X, Prophet-10, Minimoog, Moog Modular System, Moog Liberation, Linn LM-1, string arrangements (1)
 Marlon McClain – guitar solo (5, 8)
 Pat Kelly – guitar solo (7)
 Nathan East – electric bass
 John Robinson – drums (1)
 Paulinho da Costa – percussion
 Kenny Gorelick – soprano saxophone, tenor saxophone, flute, sax solos
 Tom Browne – trumpet (2, 5), flugelhorn (2, 5)
 George Del Barrio – horn and string arrangements (4, 6)
 Pete Christlieb – horn conductor (4, 6)
 Lynn Davis – backing vocals
 Sylvia St. James – backing vocals, lead vocals (6)
 Arnold McCuller – lead vocals (2, 6)
 Greg Walker – lead vocals (2)

Production 
 Jeff Lorber – producer 
 Chris Brunt – associate producer, recording, mixing
 Dennis Hansen – assistant engineer 
 Ken Perry – mastering at Capitol Mastering (Hollywood, California).
 Ria Lewerke-Shapiro – art direction 
 Sue Reilly – design 
 Aaron Rapoport – photography 
 Jeffrey Ross Music – management

Charts

References

External links
 Jeff Lorber-It's A Fact at Discogs

1982 albums
Jeff Lorber albums
Arista Records albums